KVRE (92.9 FM) is a broadcast radio station from Hot Springs Village, Arkansas, playing adult standards music.

See also
1994 in radio

References

External links

1994 establishments in Arkansas
Adult standards radio stations in the United States
Radio stations established in 1994
VRE